Axiopoena maura is a moth of the family Erebidae. It was described by Karl Eichwald in 1830. It is found in Azerbaijan, Turkmenistan, Iran, Afghanistan and northern Pakistan.

References

Callimorphina
Moths described in 1830
Moths of Asia